Eduard Papirov (Eduard Papirov; born March 3, 1964) is an Israeli former Olympic sport shooter.

He was born in USSR, and is Jewish, emigrated with parents at age 13 to Israel in 1977. When he competed in the Olympics he was 5 ft-7.5 in (172 cm) tall, and weighed 161 lbs (73 kg).

Shooting career
He competed for Israel at the 1988 Summer Olympics in Seoul at the age of 24.  He competed in Shooting--Men's Small-Bore Rifle, Three Positions, 50 metres, and came in tied for 21st.  He competed as well in Shooting--Men's Small-Bore Rifle, Prone, 50 metres, and came in tied for 24th. He competed also in Shooting--Men's Air Rifle, 10 metres, and came in tied for 34th.

At the European Shooting Championships, he finished 38th in the 50-meter free rifle event, with 590 points, in the '80s and '90s was more than 15 times Israeli champion in 60 shots prone and 3×40 (tree positions) Olympic events.

Post olympic career
Until 1997 was a schoolteacher for electronics and computer science. From 1997 to 2010 worked as R&D engineer and manager for medical devices company Medispec ltd and specialized for shock waves medical technologies. During next years he invented and patented, new acoustic pulses technology for medical and veterinary uses with large treatment zones applications. Today, he is CEO of Hi-Impacts ltd - patent holdings and CTO(founder) of Armenta ltd company for bovine and other mammals' inflammations treatments with improvement animal wellness.

References 

    

1964 births
Olympic shooters of Israel
Living people
Israeli male sport shooters
Shooters at the 1988 Summer Olympics
Jewish sport shooters
Israeli Jews